AMRI Hospitals is a private hospital chain which is headquartered in the city of Kolkata, West Bengal, India. The company's head office is in Kolkata, West Bengal, with 3 units in Kolkata (Dhakuria, Salt Lake and Mukundapur), 1 clinic in Kolkata (Southern Avenue) and 1 unit Bhubaneshwar in the Indian State of Odisha. The hospital had also opened a health center in Dhaka for its Bangladeshi patients.

Specialties 
The specialties at AMRI Hospitals include Aesthetic, Reconstructive & Plastic Surgery, Blood Bank & Transfusion Medicine, Cardiac Sciences, Dentistry & Maxillo Facial Surgery, Dermatology, Dietetics and Nutrition, Emergency Critical Care & Trauma Management, Endocrinology & Diabetology, ENT & Head Neck Surgery, Gastro Sciences, General and Minimally Invasive Surgery, Internal Medicine, IVF, Neuro Sciences, Nuclear Medicine & PET-CT, Obstetrics & Gynaecology, Onco Sciences, Ophthalmology, Orthopaedics & Joint Replacement, Paediatrics & Neonatology, Physiotherapy & Rehabilitation Medicine, Psychiatry, Pulmonology & Chest Medicine, Radiology & Interventional Radiology, Rheumatology, Urology & Nephrology.

History

The Emami Group invested in hospitals with Shrachi Group through an invitation from Shrachi Group's Shrawan Kumar Todi, a family friend. The state government of West Bengal handed control of an polyclinic in Dhakuria to AMRI Hospitals in the early 90s.

AMRI Hospitals was co-founded by the Emami Group and Shrachi Group in 1996, two of Kolkata's developing groups, in a partnership with the Government of West Bengal to expand health coverage options for consumers. The AMRI hospital is a center for training students from the Institute of Radiology and Medical Imaging, and it is ISO 9001:2000 certified.

In 2006, the promoter of AMRI Hospitals acquired Suraksha Hospitals, and renamed it as AMRI Hospitals, Salt Lake. After 2 years, the hospital was merged to leverage operational synergies by forming AMRI Hospitals. The Emami group acquired 32% stake of Shrachi Group in AMRI Hospitals in the year 2014.

Achievements & Recognition 

 AMRI Hospitals was rated as a top healthcare organisation in the eastern region of the country by AdvaHosp in collaboration with the World Health Organisation, Harvard Business Review, Joint Commission International, Mayo Clinic and Boston Consulting Group.
 AMRI Hospitals, Mukandapur was awarded "3-Star" rating by the Union Ministry of Power for excellence in energy conservation.
AMRI Hospitals, Mukundapur officially launched Eastern India's first comprehensive Airway Clinic on 10 July 2018, where both children and adults, who are suffering from disorders affecting their air passage due to various reasons, will be treated.
AMRI Hospital has been ranked as one of the best private hospitals in The Week-Hansa Survey 2018. Retaining its position among 'Best Private Hospital' in Kolkata, AMRI took it up by a notch by clinching the second rank as the 'Best Hospital' in Eastern region, besides also ranking 2nd in the 'Best Private Hospital' category also in Bhubaneswar.
AMRI Hospitals, Bhubaneswar launched an advanced trauma care centre (TCC) with an aim to facilitate timely life-saving medical care for road accident victims and other trauma patients.
AMRI Asian Cancer Institute of AMRI Hospitals- Bhubaneswar launched a unique initiative "URJA – AMRI Cancer Support" for supporting cancer patients and survivors across all its hospitals.
AMRI Hospitals, Mukundapur extracted Eastern India's longest gallbladder from 63-year-old Tapati Bhowmik. With this, the hospital stayed inches away from creating a world record.
AMRI Hospital Bhubaneswar successfully completed its first cadaveric kidney transplantation on 26 February 2020.
AMRI Hospital in Kolkata Introduces 'Virtual Visiting Hours' for Coronavirus patients, aims to make contact With kin easy amid lockdown.
AMRI Salt Lake has set up 51 beds for COVID-19 patients. Other than AMRI Salt Lake, the state-run MR Bangur Hospital has set up 1,100 beds, while the new complex of Chittaranjan National Cancer Institute has 192 beds, besides 82 more beds set up at the Infectious Diseases Hospital, Beleghata.

Awareness Campaigns & Initiatives 

AMRI Hospitals organized a social media awareness campaign. AMRI against Dengue, the campaign uses social media to spread ideas and information related with the disease, along with doctors' advice for prevention and respite.
AMRI Hospitals Kolkata has come forward with awareness campaigns with  #BeatTheRisk which was rolled out on 29 September 2018 (World Heart Day).
AMRI Hospitals, Bhubaneswar, introduced Free Bike Ambulance Service for the first time in Bhubaneswar, Odisha. With the help of these ambulances, early intervention in case of emergencies like heart attack, trauma, stroke and accident will help in saving precious lives.
AMRI Hospitals introduced NRI Privilege Health Card for Indians living in different parts of the world. The health card offers special benefits to the Indians residing in the US, UK, UAE, and many other countries, along with their parents living back home in India. In July 2019, they launched a 'Family First Card', a privilege health card aimed at NRIs and PIos to provide healthcare services to their family members who are living in India.
On World Heart Day, AMRI Hospitals, Bhubhaneswar held Cyclothon to make people aware about the ill effects of a sedentary lifestyle.
AMRI Hospitals, among the region's top private healthcare service providers, created a platform for cardiology patients to form Eastern India's first cardiac support group. To be known as the Happy Heart Club, the platform was launched by a group of patients, who have been treated in recent times.
AMRI Hospitals is recognized by Insights Success magazine in "The Recommended Hospitals in India". An annual listing of "The Most Recommended Hospitals in India" that are rendering patient-centric services alongside defining the true essence of healthcare.
AMRI Hospitals has started the New Year on a right note, with the first month of 2020 witnessing numerous health, robust initiatives and important events launched by AMRI Hospital across its various units to continue the good work.
AMRI Hospitals has launched VGo robots across its units to prevent the spread of COVID-19 and to ensure better safety for doctors and healthcare workers. The robots are being used for doctors’ consultation at isolation wards, where COVID-19 positive patients and suspected patients are admitted.
AMRI Hospitals set up a field hospital in the Salt Lake Stadium Two satellite centers were set up for COVID-19 mild and asymptomatic cases. The main hospital, a field hospital and two satellite centers were dedicated to the COVID patients.

Departments 

 Department of Aesthetic, Reconstructive & Plastic Surgery
 Department of AMRI Inst. Of Laboratory Sciences
 Department of Blood Bank & Transfusion Medicine
 Department of Cardiac Sciences
 Department of Clinical Psychology
 Department of Dentistry & Maxillo Facial Surgery
 Department of Dermatology
 Department of Emergency, Critical Care & Trauma Management
 Department of Endocrinology & Diabetology
 Department of Ent & Head Neck Surgery
 Department of Gastro Sciences
 Department of General And Minimally Invasive Surgery
 Department of Internal Medicine
 Department of IVF Centre
 Department of Nephrology
 Department of Neuro Sciences
 Department of Nuclear Medicine & Pet Ct
 Department of Obstetrics & Gynaecology
 Department of Onco Sciences
 Department of Ophthalmology
 Department of Orthopaedics & Joint Replacement
 Department of Paediatrics & Neonatology
 Department of Physiotherapy & Rehabilitation Medicine
 Department of Psychiatry
 Department of Pulmonology & Chest Medicine
 Department of Radiology & Interventional Radiology
 Department of Rheumatology

Legal Controversies

Anuradha Saha case

On 24 October 2013, the Supreme Court of India ordered AMRI Hospitals to pay compensation for medical negligence at their hospital in Kolkata that led to the death of Anuradha Saha, a US-based child psychologist, on 28 May 1998. The court described the standard of medical care at the hospital as "abysmal", and wrote that the court's decision was intended as a "deterrent and a reminder" to the medical community. The compensation, which with interest came to Rs. 11.41 crore (US$1.86 million in 2013), was the highest ever awarded by an Indian court for medical negligence.

Fire incident

A fire at the hospital occurred at Dhakuria in South Kolkata in the early morning of 9 December 2011. The fire was due to a short circuit in the electrical system. It is reported that 95 people, including members of the staff, died due to asphyxiation. Six board members were then released on bail after a temporary arrest. The Dhakuria Unit of AMRI Hospitals reopened operations two years later after it received clearance in November 2013.

References

External links 
 AMRI Hospital Dhakuria Doctor List
 AMRI Hospital Mukundapur Doctor List
 AMRI Hospital Kolkata Doctor List

Hospitals in Kolkata
Companies based in Kolkata
Indian companies established in 1996
Hospitals in Odisha
Hospitals in Bangladesh
1996 establishments in West Bengal